The Thomas Register of American Manufacturers, now Thomas, is an online platform for supplier discovery and product sourcing in the US and Canada. It was once known  as the "big green books" and "Thomas Registry", and was a multi-volume directory of industrial product information covering distributors, manufacturers and service companies within thousands of industrial categories that is now published on ThomasNet.

History
The books were first published in 1898 by Harvey Mark Thomas as Hardware and Kindred Trades. In their heyday, Thomas Register of American Manufacturers  was a 34-volume, 3 section buying guide offering sourcing information on industrial products and services, along with comprehensive specifications and detailed product information from thousands of manufacturers. 

The Thomas Regional Directory Company began as a division of Thomas Publishing in 1976. Thomas Regional Regional Industrial Buying Guides provided information in print and on CD-ROM,  on local OEMs, distributors, MRO services and other custom manufacturing services in 19 regional editions covering much of the United States. Thomas Register and Thomas Regional were available online from the mid 1990s. The company stopped publishing its print products in 2006.

Thomas moved its database online as ThomasNet, published and maintained by Thomas Industrial Network, one of Thomas’ five business units. ThomasNet has expanded to provide not only product and company information, but also online catalogs, computer-aided design (CAD) drawings, news, press releases and blogs.

In December 2021, Thomas was acquired by Xometry.

Thomas Publishing Company, LLC
Thomas Publishing Company, LLC of New York City has been privately held since its inception. It used independent representatives to sell advertising space around its listings in print products like the Thomas Register and the Thomas Industrial Regional Directories, and these representatives continue to sell Internet related products to manufacturers, distributors, and other companies.

ThomasNet
ThomasNet is an information and technology company based in New York City. In April 2006 the New York Public Library named ThomasNet.com as one of its 25 Best of Reference sources for the reference librarian, and is currently listed in their Best of the Web list for Industry Information.

Since November 2010, ThomasNet has been a founding partner of GlobalTrade.net, a marketplace for international trade service providers.

ThomasNet News
ThomasNet News is a product of Thomas Publishing Company, LLC. ThomasNet News was introduced with “the mission of delivering timely, new industrial product information covering the whole range of products …” It manually reviews press releases submitted through the website and publishes with a small description in one of 51 different categories.

In 2000, ThomasNet News released Industry Market Trends (IMT), its first Journal. In the IMT, editors published editorials, interviews, and long form journalism on issues ranging from career skills, developments in the industry, and discussions with leading experts. Soon after, IMT Green & Clean was launched in response to the growing interest in green technology and its impact on the world. In 2011, the IMT Machining Journal was launched followed by the IMT Fluid & Gas Flow Journal, the IMT Career Journal, and the IMT Procurement Journal.

Research
Starting in 2010, ThomasNet began reaching out to its database of manufacturers to get a better understanding of where the community was, where their shortcomings were, and where they saw the landscape going in the future. This yearly survey is called the Industry Market Barometer.

References

External links
 

Promotion and marketing communications
Marketing books
Directories